Xenorhina adisca is a species of frogs in the family Microhylidae. It is endemic to West Papua, Indonesia. It is only known from its type locality, Tembagapura, in the Sudirman Range. The specific name adisca refers to the absence of digital discs, a defining feature of the species.

Description
This species is only known from the type series consisting of two females and a juvenile of unknown sex. The adult females measured  and the juvenile  in snout–vent length. The head is moderately wide. The dorsum is dark brown and the venter bright red; dorsal and lateral surfaces have scattered low and rounded tubercles. The fingers and toes are unwebbed and lack digital discs.

Habitat and conservation
The site is a steep, south-west facing slope drained by a small stream. Xenorhina adisca is fossorial, and the types were collected from within the surface litter during the day. No threats to this species are known.

References

Adisca
Amphibians of Western New Guinea
Endemic fauna of Indonesia
Endemic fauna of New Guinea
Amphibians described in 2003
Taxa named by Allen Allison
Taxa named by Edward Frederick Kraus
Taxonomy articles created by Polbot